Darnall railway station is on the Sheffield to Lincoln Line and was built in 1849 to serve Darnall, a community about  from the centre of Sheffield, South Yorkshire, England, and which later became a suburb of the city.

As of March 2020, Darnall is the least used railway station in the county of South Yorkshire.

History
The station was built by the Manchester, Sheffield and Lincolnshire Railway (M.S.& L.R.) with two platforms flanking the main lines. The main station building, on the Cleethorpes-bound side, contained the usual facilities, and was situated at the top of Station Road; a waiting shelter on the Sheffield-bound platform gave passengers some comfort. Widening took place in the area just before the First World War and two goods lines were laid around the back of the platforms. This was to increase capacity of the line and aid the movement of coal traffic towards Immingham Docks, opened in 1912.

The tracks through Darnall were electrified from 1955 to 1981, though only to allow electrically hauled goods trains to reach Rotherwood Yard. There was also a chord line round to Attercliffe Junction on the former South Yorkshire Railway line towards  and Doncaster until the late 1980s - this was removed after the closure of the old Darnall West signal box in 1989.

Present station
The station itself was rebuilt in 1928 to an island platform design, much favoured by the Great Central, which the M.S.& L.R. had become on the opening of its extension to London (Marylebone) in 1899. In this redesign the tracks in the centre of the layout, the "Down Main" (in the direction of Sheffield) and the "Up Goods" (in the direction of Cleethorpes) became the "Up" and "Down" main lines and served the platform faces; the original "Up Main" (in the direction of Cleethorpes) and the "Down Goods" (in the direction of Sheffield) became the "Up Goods" and "Down Goods" respectively.

Darnall was one of the first stations in the area to be destaffed since tickets are now sold on board. The station is a shadow of its former self, with just a simple waiting shelter on its platform. Passenger numbers are low and rumours of closure regularly circulate.

Services
All services at Darnall are operated by Northern Trains using  and  DMUs.

The typical off-peak service in trains per hour is:
 1 tph to  via 
 1 tph to  via 

References

External links

Railway stations in Sheffield
DfT Category F2 stations
Former Great Central Railway stations
Railway stations in Great Britain opened in 1849
Woodhead Line
Northern franchise railway stations
1849 establishments in England